The Guilty is a 1947 film noir directed by John Reinhardt, based on Cornell Woolrich's short story "Two Men in a Furnished Room". The film was produced by oil millionaire Jack Wrather, the husband of lead actress Bonita Granville.

Plot
Mike Carr and Johnny Dixon are roommates. After many months Mike returns to his old New York neighborhood and goes into Tim McGinnis’ bar to wait for Estelle Mitchell, a woman he hasn't seen since soon after her twin sister Linda was murdered. He sits down and starts having flashbacks of the events around Linda's death.

Johnny had been dating Estelle until he discovered that she was seeing other men. He dumped her and began a relationship with her sweet twin, Linda.

Due to a head injury he had suffered during the war, Johnny experienced regular nervous breakdowns. He and Mike served in the army together and, being roommates, Mike nursed him through these.

Johnny and Linda were very much in love, but Estelle wanted him back and was determined to break up the happy couple. In the meantime, she was seeing Mike, who had a hard time resisting her vampy style.

Mike only met Linda once, but he realized she was the sister he wanted to put energy into catching; she was more virtuous and engaging.

But the twins both wanted Johnny, and one night they got into a fight over him, after which Linda went to see Johnny. Estelle tried to intercept and get to Johnny's first.

Mike sees Estelle arrive before Linda and stops her from coming between the two lovers. However, when Mike returns to his apartment alone a couple of hours later, Estelle telephones Mike from her home and at her mother's request, to say that Linda never came home and has been reported missing.

Mike finds Johnny, drunk and distraught. He begs Mike to verify his alibi - that Linda had left his and Mike's place after an argument with Johnny, and that he heard Linda whistle for, and then saw her get into, a taxi.

When the police arrive at the scene they find a buckle from Linda's trench-coat on Johnny's apartment floor and, after finding Linda's body in the apartment building, they take Johnny in for questioning.

Mike passes by McGinnis' bar and finds another buckle outside the bathroom window. He goes to Johnny and mentions the possibility that Johnny's memory might have failed him the night of the murder. While they are talking, the police arrive to arrest Johnny and he panics. Mike helps his friend by letting him escape out the back.

In order to persuade Mike to give Johnny up, Detective Heller takes Mike to the morgue to show him Linda's trashed body. Heller then recounts the horrible details of Linda's death: After being choked, Linda was pushed, still alive, into the chute of the trash incinerator, and when he was unable to fit her in the tight space, the murderer shoved her in and broke her neck. The murderer then pulled her out and put her in a barrel on the roof.

Mike is disgusted by this, but still doesn't believe his friend murdered Linda. He convinces Johnny to come out of hiding and clear his name. As they arrive home, Estelle is waiting for them with a man named Alex Tremholt, who has been renting a room at the Mitchells' since the twins were young.

While they are there, Mike hears a woman whistle for a taxi, and realizes that must be the same woman Johnny heard the night of the murder. When Tremholt sees Johnny, he insists on calling the police to arrest him, but Johnny escapes once more. Detective Heller arrives and suspects Tremholt of having a long-standing, unrequited love for Estelle and of killing the innocent Linda, whom he mistook for Estelle, the object of his desire. With the truth being revealed, Mike hurries off to tell Johnny he is in the clear and just manages to stop him from hanging himself.

Back in the present, Estelle shows up at McGinnis' and Mike drags her to his old apartment and insinuates that she committed the murder. When he enters the flat, however, Heller is waiting to arrest him. The detective reveals that Jake, the apartment janitor, recently found Linda's neck scarf in the incinerator chute with Mike's fingerprints all over it. It turns out that Mike killed Linda, believing she was Estelle. After telling Mike that the accusations he had made against Tremholt were only a trick, Heller accompanies Mike down the stairs, and past Estelle, into the night.

Cast
 Bonita Granville as Estelle Mitchell/Linda Mitchell
 Don Castle as Mike Carr
 Regis Toomey as Detective Heller
 John Litel as Alex Tremholt
 Wally Cassell as Johnny Dixon
 Thomas E. Jackson as Tim McGinnis
 Netta Packer as Mrs. Mitchell

Reception

Critical response
In a 2004 review film critic Dennis Schwartz gave the film a somewhat positive review, writing, "John Reinhardt economically directs a crisp crime thriller from the screenplay by Robert R. Presnell, Sr. that is based on the short story "Two Men in a Furnished Room" by Cornell Woolrich. Though the surprise ending is hardly convincing or for that matter original (Robert Siodmak's The Dark Mirror covered the same territory of identical twins in a superior fashion), and the acting was rather stiff, nevertheless this cheapie Monogram flick always kept me interested in the twisty plot and was quite engaging as it adequately covered the film noir conventions of following the dark sides of the main characters."

References

External links 
 
 
 
 

1947 films
1947 drama films
American black-and-white films
Film noir
Films about twin sisters
Monogram Pictures films
Films based on short fiction
1947 crime drama films
American crime drama films
1940s English-language films
1940s American films